The Savings Bank (Scotland) Act 1819 (59 Geo 3 c 62) is an Act of the Parliament of the United Kingdom.

Section 2 of the Savings Bank Act 1835 (5 & 6 Will 4 c 57) repealed the Savings Bank (Scotland) Act 1819, so far as the same was applicable to any savings bank thereafter to be formed and established in Scotland from and after 9 September 1835. Section 2 further provided that the provisions of the Savings Bank (Scotland) Act 1819 were to continue in force as to all savings banks established under it before 9 September 1835 unless and until they conformed to and were established under the provisions of the 9 Geo 4 c 92 and the 3 Will 4 c 14.

Section 1 of the Trustee Savings Bank Act 1863 (26 & 27 Vict c 87) provided that this Act was to continue in force as to all savings banks established under it before the passing of that Act, unless and until they conformed to and were established under the provisions of that Act.

Section 96(4)(a) of the Trustee Savings Banks Act 1969 provided that nothing in the repeals made by section 82 of the Trustee Savings Banks Act 1954 was to affect the application of the Savings Bank (Scotland) Act 1819 to any savings bank established under that Act before 28 July 1863 unless and until that bank became a trustee savings bank.

Section 55(2) of, and paragraph 15(a) of Schedule 7 to, the Trustee Savings Banks Act 1981 provided that nothing in the repeals made by the Trustee Savings Banks Act 1954 was to affect the application of the Savings Bank (Scotland) Act 1819 to any savings bank established under that Act before 28 July 1863 unless and until that bank became a trustee savings bank.

See further article 12(h) of the Trustee Savings Banks Act 1985 (Appointed Day) (No. 4) Order 1986 (SI 1986/1223) (C 36).

Sections 2 and 4 were amended by section 24(1) of, and Schedule 1 to, the District Courts (Scotland) Act 1975.

References

External links
The Savings Bank (Scotland) Act 1819, as amended, from the National Archives.

United Kingdom Acts of Parliament 1819
Acts of the Parliament of the United Kingdom concerning Scotland
1819 in Scotland
Banking in Scotland